The 1994 Volvo International was a men's tennis tournament played on outdoor hard courts at the Cullman-Heyman Tennis Center in New Haven, Connecticut in the United States and was part of the Championship Series of the 1994 ATP Tour. It was the 22nd edition of the tournament and ran from August 15 through August 22, 1994. Third-seeded Boris Becker won the singles title.

Finals

Singles

 Boris Becker defeated  Marc Rosset 6–3, 7–5
 It was Becker's 3rd singles title of the year and the 41st of his career.

Doubles

 Grant Connell /  Patrick Galbraith defeated  Jacco Eltingh /  Paul Haarhuis 6–4, 7–6
 It was Connell's 3rd title of the year and the 10th of his career. It was Galbraith's 3rd title of the year and the 18th of his career.

References

External links
 ITF – New Haven tournament details